Madison station may refer to:
Madison station (Connecticut), a train station serving Shore Line East in Madison, Connecticut
Madison station (Florida), a former train station serving Amtrak in Madison, Florida
Madison station (New Jersey), a train station serving New Jersey Transit in Madison, New Jersey
Madison station (South Dakota), a former train station serving the Milwaukee Road in Madison, South Dakota
A series of train stations in Madison, Wisconsin
Madison station (C&NW), serving the Chicago and North Western
Madison station (Milwaukee Road), serving the Milwaukee Road in West Madison
Franklin Street station (Wisconsin), serving the Milwaukee Road in East Madison